Liga Paralela de Béisbol (translated: Parallel Baseball League) is a baseball league competition held in Venezuela during the winter. Its relationship to the  Venezuelan Professional Baseball League is similar to that of the AA and AAA Minor League Baseball leagues to Major League Baseball in the U.S.A.  After players finish the league competition, they often join the MLB. It gives some of the younger Venezuelan players an opportunity to play in their home country during the winter.

Many player who join the league during the international signing period have not played in the Dominican Summer League or the Venezuelan Summer League, thus the Liga Paralela can provide a first glimpse at some of the year's top Venezuelan signings.  International scouts say the quality of the league has improved over the last few years and has become an indicator of whether players are ready to make the leap to a rookie league in the United States.

This winter league is organized by the same organization that runs the Venezuelan Summer League.

Teams

References

External links
 Official site

Baseball leagues in Venezuela